The Martin Luther King Jr. East Busway is a two-lane bus-only highway serving the city of Pittsburgh and many of its eastern neighborhoods and suburbs. It was named after Martin Luther King Jr. in recognition of the eastern portion of the route's serving many predominantly African-American neighborhoods, such as Wilkinsburg and East Liberty.  It is owned and maintained by Pittsburgh Regional Transit.

The Institute for Transportation and Development Policy (ITDP), under its BRT Standard, has given the East Busway corridor a Bronze ranking.

History 

Originally occupied by a railroad line, planning for the East Busway began shortly after the Port Authority of Allegheny County purchased the Pittsburgh Railways Company in 1964.  The original segment of the busway opened in February 1983, running between Downtown Pittsburgh and Edgewood, a length of 6.8 miles.

In July 2013, the East Busway was discussed in the context of the Mon Fayette Expressway.

Routes 

Following the naming convention of each busway being designated by a color, bus routes that use the East Busway begin with a "P" for purple. However, the P13 (Mount Royal Flyer) is colored purple and uses a "P" designation, but does not use the busway; instead, it travels via Route 28. The P1 ("East Busway All Stops") is the main route, operating seven days a week and running the full length of the Busway between Swissvale and Downtown Pittsburgh, making all stops, before running a short loop through the central business district. It is the busiest Pittsburgh Regional Transit bus route by ridership. This route is supplemented by the P2 (East Busway Short), which runs on weekdays only and terminates in Wilkinsburg.

All busway routes travel to downtown Pittsburgh, making a loop around before returning via the busway. The one exception to this is the P3 (East Busway-Oakland), which starts in Swissvale, but leaves the busway via the Neville Street Ramp, serving the business district of Oakland and terminating at Robinson Street.

Many of the Pittsburgh Regional Transit's express and suburban Flyer routes also use the busway, but with stop restrictions, not picking up passengers at some busway stations in the inbound direction or dropping off passengers at some busway stations in the outbound direction. These routes operate primarily during weekday rush hours allowing buses to bypass the heavily congested Parkway East (Interstate 376), making for faster trip times. The East Busway is also used by some Westmoreland Transit routes, which run further into the Pittsburgh suburbs, ending in the cities of Greensburg and Latrobe in Westmoreland County.

As of October 2018, the Pittsburgh Regional Transit bus routes that use the East Busway are as follows:

Stations

See also 
West Busway
South Busway
Pittsburgh Light Rail

References

External links 

Port Authority of Allegheny County: East Busway information page
East Busway Schedule – P1, P2, P3
East Busway Route Map – P1, P2, P3

Port Authority of Allegheny County
Bus rapid transit in Pennsylvania
Busways
Transportation in Pittsburgh
1983 establishments in Pennsylvania